Vaticanology is a term coined in the 20th century to describe the field of journalism and research studying and reporting about how the Holy See and the Roman Catholic Church operate. It is named after the Vatican City, the Holy See's sovereign territory enclaved within Rome, Italy. Particular emphasis tend to be  placed on the selection and appointment mechanisms by which the Church's leadership emerges.

A journalist or scholar focusing on this area of expertise is sometimes referred to as a Vaticanologist, Vaticanist, or Vatican watcher.

Origin and history
It owes its origins to the term Kremlinologist, which was used to describe media, academic and commentary experts who followed the function of the Communist Party of the Soviet Union in general and the functioning and selection of the leadership elite in particular.

Both the Kremlin and the Holy See operated in a great degree of secrecy and mystery, hence the attention paid to "experts" who were presumed to be able to read subtle nuances indicating who was on the "way up", who was on the "way down" and who were the "ones to watch" within their leadership elites.

Famous Vaticanologists include the author and commentator Peter Hebblethwaite, who wrote biographies of (among others) Pope John XXIII and Pope Paul VI, as well as a best-selling account of the events of 1978 in Year of Three Popes. Robert Blair Kaiser was a noted contributor in the field, who did much reporting on the Second Vatican Council for TIME.

In 2005, with the first papal election in the age of the continuous news cycle and the internet, many Vaticanologists became prominent through their wide dissemination both on television and in online publications. Blogs have become a popular means for amateur Vatican watchers to share their thoughts and insights.

List of recent Vaticanists
John L. Allen Jr., Crux Now
Matthew Bunson, EWTN and National Catholic Register
Gerson Camarotti, Globo News
Massimo Franco, Corriere della Sera
Eric Frattini, Mauri Spagnol Group, Sperling & Kupfer
Delia Gallagher, CNN's Faith and Values correspondent
Michael Hewitt-Gleeson, vaticanology.net
Robert Hutchinson, author of When in Rome: A Journal of Life in Vatican City
Sandro Magister, L'Espresso
Vasin Manasurangul, Pope Report
George Menachery, Vatican Adventure
Robert Mickens, globalpulse.com
Frédéric Mounier, La Croix
Robert Moynihan, Inside the Vatican
Gerard O'Connell, America
Rocco Palmo, Whispers in the Loggia
Catherine Pepinster, The Tablet
Elisabetta Piqué, La Nación
Marco Politi, La Repubblica
Philip Pullela, Reuters
Peter Steinfels, The New York Times
Damian Thompson, The Catholic Herald
Andrea Tornielli, Il Giornale, La Stampa 
Paul Vallely, papal biographer, Pope Francis – Untying the Knots
Giancarlo Zizola, Le Monde

References

Catholic culture
Election of the Pope
Subfields of political science
Society of Vatican City